The Ngong Hills are peaks in a ridge along the Great Rift Valley, located southwest near Nairobi, in southern Kenya. The word "Ngong" is an Anglicization of a Maasai phrase "enkong'u emuny" meaning rhinoceros spring, and this name derives from a spring located near Ngong Town.

The Ngong Hills, from the eastside slopes, overlook the Nairobi National Park and, off to the north, the city of Nairobi.

During the years of British colonial rule, the area around the Ngong Hills was a major settler farming region, and many traditional colonial houses are still seen in the area. In the 1985 film Out of Africa, the four peaks of the Ngong Hills appear in the background of several scenes near Karen Blixen's house.  Local residents still reported seeing lions in the Hills during the 1990s. The solitary grave of Denys Finch Hatton, marked by an obelisk and garden, is located on the eastern slopes of the Ngong Hills, overlooking the Nairobi National Park.

There is a walking trail along the tops of the Ngong Hills. Kenya Forestry Service has a small post at the NE foot of the park. There is a KSH 600 fee for visitors. Local residents have sometimes held Sunday church services on the southern peak, overlooking the Great Rift Valley.

Near the hills is the town of Ngong. The Ngong Hills Wind Power Station was completed in 2015. This is the first wind farm in the country. 

Kenya Forestry Service offers guides/security to accompany hikers for an extra fee (KES 2000).

Bruce MacKenzie, Minister of Agriculture in Kenya, was killed when a time bomb attached to his plane exploded as it flew above Ngong Hills in a flight from Entebbe, Uganda on May 24, 1978, after Ugandan President Idi Amin ordered Ugandan agents to assassinate MacKenzie.

References

External links

 Photo of Ngong Hills from game reserve: showing entire ridge, with Rift Valley behind [Kijabe.org].
 Photos of Ngong area and from top of Ngong Hills.
 Photo of Ngong Hills from Blixen lawn: showing yard left of Karen Blixen house, with Ngong Hills behind [from AAA-Calif.com].
 Photo of Ngong Hills from Great Rift Valley: showing severe drop, with Nairobi suburbs on opposite side [PBase.com].
 Photo of Ngong Hills from Great Rift Valley, closeup: showing vegetation, Nairobi suburbs on opposite side [PBase.com].
 Photo of Ngong Hills from Great Rift Valley, closeup: showing vegetation, suburbs [full webpage from PBase.com].

Mountain ranges of Kenya